The 2011 Madrid Masters (also known as the Mutua Madrid Open for sponsorship reasons) was played on outdoor clay courts at the Park Manzanares in Madrid, Spain from 30 April – 8 May. It was the 10th edition of the event on the ATP and 3rd on the WTA. It was classified as an ATP World Tour Masters 1000 event on the 2011 ATP World Tour and a Premier Mandatory event on the 2011 WTA Tour.

Ion Țiriac, the former Romanian ATP player and now billionaire businessman, was the owner of the tournament.

Points and prize money

Point distribution

Prize money
All money is in US dollars

ATP entrants

Seeds

 Rankings are as of 25 April 2011.

Other entrants
The following players received wildcards into the main draw:
  Pablo Andújar
  Juan Carlos Ferrero
  Marcel Granollers
  Kei Nishikori

The following players received entry using a protected ranking into the main draw:
  Juan Martín del Potro
  Ivo Karlović

The following players received entry from the qualifying draw:

  Flavio Cipolla
  Thiemo de Bakker
  Alejandro Falla
  Daniel Gimeno Traver
  Victor Hănescu
  Adrian Mannarino
  Pere Riba

The following player received entry as a lucky loser:
  Olivier Rochus

Withdrawals
 Ernests Gulbis (respiratory problems) → replaced by  Olivier Rochus
 Tommy Haas → replaced by  Santiago Giraldo
 Philipp Kohlschreiber → replaced by  Xavier Malisse
 David Nalbandian → replaced by  Potito Starace
 Tommy Robredo (knee injury) → replaced by  Ivo Karlović

WTA entrants

Seeds

 Rankings are as of 26 April 2011.

Other entrants
The following players received wildcards into the main draw:
  Anabel Medina Garrigues
  Arantxa Parra Santonja
  Laura Pous Tió
  Arantxa Rus
  Dinara Safina

The following players received entry from the qualifying draw:

  Sofia Arvidsson
  Olga Govortsova
  Simona Halep
  Vania King
  Nuria Llagostera Vives
  Sania Mirza
  Monica Niculescu
  Chanelle Scheepers

Withdrawals
  Timea Bacsinszky → replaced by  Elena Vesnina
  Anna Chakvetadze → replaced by  Zheng Jie
  Kim Clijsters (torn ligaments, right ankle) → replaced by  Bojana Jovanovski
  Anastasija Sevastova → replaced by  Ayumi Morita
  Serena Williams (pulmonary embolism) → replaced by  Vera Dushevina
  Venus Williams (torn abdominal) → replaced by  Kimiko Date-Krumm

Finals

Men's singles

 Novak Djokovic defeated  Rafael Nadal 7–5, 6–4 
It was Djokovic's 6th title of the year and 24th of his career. It was his third Masters title this year, and his eighth overall. He extended his winning streak to 32 matches since the beginning of 2011 and 34 since 2010 Davis Cup final.

Women's singles

 Petra Kvitová defeated  Victoria Azarenka 7–6(7–3), 6–4
It was Kvitová's 3rd title of the year and 4th of her career.

Men's doubles

 Bob Bryan /  Mike Bryan defeated  Michaël Llodra /  Nenad Zimonjić 6–3, 6–3

Women's doubles

 Victoria Azarenka /  Maria Kirilenko defeated  Květa Peschke /  Katarina Srebotnik 6–4, 6–3

References

External links
Official website

 
2011 ATP World Tour
2011 WTA Tour
2011 in Spanish tennis